Wait for Love is the fourth studio album by American rock band, Pianos Become the Teeth. The album was released on February 15, 2018 through Epitaph Records.

Critical reception 

Wait for Love has received generally positive reviews from music critics. At review aggregator site Metacritic, which assigns a normalized rating out of 100 to reviews from critics, the album received a score of 75 out of 100, indicating "generally favorable reviews based on seven critics."

Track listing

References

External links 
 
 Wait For Love at Epitaph Records
 

2018 albums
Pianos Become the Teeth albums
Epitaph Records albums
Albums produced by Will Yip